Gudlavalleru mandal is one of the 25 mandals in the Krishna district of Andhra Pradesh state in India. It falls under Gudivada revenue division.

Villages in Gudlavalleru Mandal
 Angaluru 
 Chandrala
 Chinagonnuru
 Chitram
 Dokeparru
 Gadepudi
 Gudlavalleru
 Kowtharam
 Kurada
 Mamidikolla
 Nagavaram
 Penjendra
 Pesaramilli
 Puritipadu
 Serikalvapudi
 seridaggumilli
 ulavalapudi
 vadlamannadu
 vemavaram
 vemavarapallem
 venuthurumilli

References 

Mandals in Krishna district